Strafing is the act of moving sideways in a video game relative to the player's forward direction. Strafing allows a player to keep the camera focused on a target such as an enemy, while moving in a different direction.

Techniques

Circle strafing

Circle strafing is the technique of moving around an opponent in a circle while facing them. Circle strafing allows a player to fire continuously at an opponent while evading their attacks. Circle strafing is most useful in close-quarters combat where the apparent motion of the circle strafing player is much greater than that of their stationary enemy, and thus the chance of making the enemy lose track of their target is higher and/or the enemy is required to lead the target when firing. The effectiveness of circle strafing is mitigated when the opponent's weapon fires projectiles that travel instantaneously (also referred to as a hitscan weapon), or fires at a high rate, e.g. with a machine gun.

Circle strafing is especially effective when lag negatively affects the players' ability to hit their target. When latency is high and the game doesn't have client-side hit detection, this can lead to two players circling each other, both missing all their attacks.

Many shooters will allow players to aim down the sights of a gun or use a scope, usually exchanging movement speed and field of vision for greater accuracy. This can make a player more vulnerable to circle strafing, as targets will pass through their field of vision more quickly, they are less capable of keeping up with a target, and their slow movement makes dodging more difficult.

Strafing in melee combat

Circle strafing has also spread to some 3D action and adventure video games that involve melee combat. Circle strafing in melee combat can be made easier with a lock-on system that snaps the camera's (and the player character's) focus on one particular target, guaranteeing that most of the player character's attacks will land a direct hit on the target. It enables the player character to concentrate on moving around the enemy to dodge their attacks while staying automatically focused on the enemy. This can be a crucial strategy against bosses and powerful enemies, and is notably employed in many The Legend of Zelda titles, starting with Ocarina of Time.

Strafe-running

Particularly in early first-person shooters, strafe-running (known as speed-strafing among players of GoldenEye 007 and Perfect Dark, and as trichording among players of the Descent series) is a technique that allows a player to run or fly faster through levels by moving forwards and sideways at the same time. The game combines these actions and the player achieves roughly 1.4 (square root of 2) times the speed they would moving in a single direction. The method used by the game can be demonstrated using vector addition. Pathways into Darkness was one of the first games to allow strafe-running.

The games in which strafe-running can be employed treat forward motion independently of sideways (strafing) motion. Thus, in games with such behavior, moving sideways while simultaneously moving forward will give an overall higher speed than just moving forward, although the player will move in a direction diagonal to the direction being faced. This feature is even more enhanced if moving along three axes (e.g. forward + left + up), providing  (roughly 1.73) times greater speed, in games such as Descent.

This technique is not possible in all games; most and especially modern games would clamp the player's speed and acceleration to a uniform maximum when moving in any direction.

Strafe-jumping 

Strafe-jumping is a technique used to increase a player's movement speed in computer games based on the Quake engine and its successors, most of which are first-person shooters.

History 

Strafe-jumping was a result of a bug in the code base of the 1996 first-person shooter video game Quake. In Quake's sequels it was decided to be kept intact, as it had become a standard technique used by players. The exploit relies on an oversight in acceleration and maximum speed calculation: when pressing a movement key, the game adds an acceleration vector in that direction to the player's current velocity. When the player has reached a maximum speed value, further acceleration is prevented. However, the movement speed limit is only applied in relation to the acceleration vector's direction and not the direction of the overall velocity, meaning that precisely manipulating the angle between overall velocity and this acceleration vector lets the player break the intended speed cap.

Method 

Strafe-jumping requires a precise combination of mouse and keyboard inputs. The exact technique involved depends on the game in question. In several games, there are entire maps devoted to this, much like obstacle courses.

The controls are typically as follows:
 The player holds the move forward key, accelerating to the maximum walking speed.
 The player jumps and simultaneously starts holding either the strafe left or the strafe right key.
 While airborne, the player moves the mouse slowly in the direction they're strafing. This turns the character and directs the acceleration to an angle that lets the player break the speed cap.
 To prevent speed loss from ground friction, the player immediately jumps again on landing.
 Strafe-jumping this way will slowly curve the player's trajectory, so to compensate the player can switch the direction of strafing and mouse movement to the opposite side.

Done correctly and continuously, this will gradually increase the player's speed. Mastering this technique requires much practice. Sustained strafe-jumping is mainly a matter of muscle memory, as both the required range and precision of mouse movements increase as the player builds up speed.

In Quake III Arena and some games based on its engine, such as Call of Duty and Wolfenstein: Enemy Territory, slight increases in jump height can be achieved by playing the game at specific frame rates.

Circle jump 

The circle jump is an action performed by the player at the start of strafe-jumping, giving an initial burst of speed. It uses the same mechanics as strafe-jumping, but on the ground before the first jump, and requires faster mouse movement.

The controls are as follows:
 The player stands facing 90-135 degrees away from the direction they desire to eventually move in.
 The player starts holding both the move forward key and the strafe key towards the desired direction, and also moves the mouse in the same direction. This turns and rapidly accelerates the player.
 When the player is facing the desired movement direction, they jump to preserve the gained speed.
 The player can now start strafe-jumping and continue accelerating.

Bunny hopping 

Bunny hopping is a broadly used term for different kinds of movement in games. A player who simply jumps up and down to be more difficult to target is sometimes called a bunny hopper. Jumping on sloped surfaces to gain speed is called bunny hopping in games such as The Elder Scrolls Online. Some games feature more technical exploits known as bunny hopping which allow the player to move faster or more nimbly than normal. In games utilising the Quake or GoldSrc game engines or their derivatives, bunny hopping is a technique related to strafe-jumping that lets a player accelerate beyond the speed cap and change direction quickly mid-air.

The kind of advanced bunny hopping that utilizes strafing controls exists in Quake, the Quake III Arena mod Challenge ProMode Arena, and their derivatives such as Warsow and Xonotic; Half-Life (version 1.1.0.8, released in 2001, introduced a speed cap limiting the effectiveness of bunny hopping) and many of its mods and sibling games such as Team Fortress Classic, Team Fortress 2, Dystopia, and the Counter-Strike series; Painkiller, Dark Messiah of Might and Magic, Kingpin: Life of Crime, Titanfall 2, and Apex Legends.

References

Esports techniques
Video game terminology